Trupanea tubulata is a species of tephritid or fruit flies in the genus Trupanea of the family Tephritidae.

Distribution
Israel, Zambia, Mozambique, Namibia, Zimbabwe, South Africa.

References

Tephritinae
Insects described in 1964
Diptera of Africa
Diptera of Asia